Trapt Live! is the first live album by American rock band Trapt, released on September 18, 2007 by Eleven Seven Music. The live album contains two new studio tracks, "Stay Alive" and "Everything to Lose", while the rest was recorded during live performances. "Stay Alive" was released as a single in 2007.

Track listing

Other media
"Stay Alive" and "Made of Glass" found on Trapt.com in acoustic versions as well as nine videos released in 5.1 surround sound and stereo.

Personnel
 Chris Taylor Brown – lead vocals, rhythm guitar on "Echo"
 Simon Ormandy – lead guitar
 Pete Charell – bass
 Aaron 'Monty' Montgomery – drums

References

2007 live albums
Trapt albums
Eleven Seven Label Group live albums